Six Cylinder Love is a 1931 American pre-Code comedy film directed by Thornton Freeland and starring Spencer Tracy, Sidney Fox and Edward Everett Horton. It was produced and distributed by Fox Film Corporation and is a remake of their 1923 silent original. Both films are based on the 1921 Broadway play. It recorded a loss of $25,000. A further remake The Honeymoon's Over was released in 1939.

Synopsis
A fast-talking auto salesman persuades a couple of newlyweds to purchase a new car that they can ill afford to boost their social prestige. It soon proves to be more trouble than it is worth, leading to the wife getting into trouble by drunk driving and the husband to fall foul of his boss. Eventually, with the help of the auto salesman, they find someone else to sell the car to.

Cast
 Spencer Tracy as William Donroy
 Edward Everett Horton as Monty Winston
 Sidney Fox as Marilyn Sterling
 Lorin Raker as Gilbert Sterling
 William Collier, Sr. as Richard Burton
 Una Merkel as Margaret Rogers
 William Holden as 	Stapleton
 Bert Roach as Harold Rogers
 Ruth Warren as  Mrs. Burton
 El Brendel as Axel

References

External links
 Six Cylinder Love in the Internet Movie Database
allmovie/synopsis; Six Cylinder Love

1931 films
Films directed by Thornton Freeland
Fox Film films
American films based on plays
1931 comedy films
American comedy films
Films produced by William Fox
American black-and-white films
Remakes of American films
1930s English-language films
1930s American films